Athletissima is an annual athletics meeting in Lausanne, Switzerland. Previously one of the five IAAF Super Grand Prix events, it is now part of the Diamond League.

The first edition was held on 8 July 1977 in the Stade Pierre de Coubertin. In 1986 the event was moved to the Stade olympique de la Pontaise.

The UBS has been the main sponsor of Athletissima Lausanne since 1982. Other sponsors are Vaudoise Assurances, Omega, Erdgas and Nike.

World records
Over the course of its history, three world records have been set at Athletissima.

Meeting records

Men

Women

See also
Spitzen Leichtathletik Luzern

Notes and references

External links

 Diamond League – Lausanne Official Web Site

Sports competitions in Lausanne
Athletics in Switzerland
Diamond League
IAAF Super Grand Prix
Recurring sporting events established in 1977
1977 establishments in Switzerland
IAAF Grand Prix
IAAF World Outdoor Meetings